Bimbo Ademoye  (born 4 February 1991), is a Nigerian actress. She was nominated for Best Actress in a Comedy/TV series at the Africa Magic Viewers Choice Awards in 2018, for her role in the film Backup Wife (2017).

Early life and education 
Bimbo Ademoye was born on 4 February 1991,  in Lagos, Southwestern Nigeria. She obtained her secondary education from Mayflower School and is an alumna of Covenant University where she studied Business Administration. In an interview with The Punch newspaper, she said she was raised by a single father who supported her chosen profession.

Career 
In an interview with The Daily Independent newspaper, Bimbo Ademoye said that her acting career began in 2014 when she was cast in the short film Where Talent Lies. The film received accolades from the Africa International Film Festival. She describes Uduak Isong as her mentor, who assisted her in getting into the industry. In 2015, Ademoye was cast in her first feature film Its About Your Husband, which was also produced by Isong. 
In a 2018 compilation by Premium Times newspaper, she was listed as one of five actors who were predicted to have a successful career before the end of the year. In April 2018,she co-featured with Stella Damasus in Gone, which was directed by Daniel Ademinokan. Ademoye described working with Damasus as a motivating moment in her career. At the 2018 City People Movie Awards, she was nominated for Revelation of the Year, Best New Actress and Best Upcoming Actress. Bimbo's role in Backup Wife also earned her a nomination for Best Lead Role at the 2018 Nigeria Entertainment Awards. She has also received two individual nominations at the 2018 Best of Nollywood Awards for her role in Personal Assistant, winning the award for Best Actress in a Supporting Role and getting a nomination for Best Kiss in a Movie. Bimbo Ademoye has been described as a celebrity style icon by several media outlets.

Filmography 
 Girlfriends (2019)
 The Family (2019)
 Kamsi (2018)
 Getting Over Him (2018)
 Light in the Dark (2018) 
 Personal Assistant (2018) 
 Desperate Housegirls  
 Gone (2018)
 Last Days
 The Backup Wife 
 Diary of a Crazy Nigerian Woman 
 It's About Your Husband
 Charmed
 Rofia Tailor Loran
 This Is It (2016)
My Wife & I (2017)
Light In The Dark (2019)
 Looking for Baami (2019)
  Feels Like Heaven (2019)
  Reach (2019)
  Special Package (2019)
 Sugar Rush
 Dear Affy (2020)
Reach (2020)
Nneka the Pretty Serpent (2020)Creepy Lives Here (2021)Breaded LifeLies in between (2021)13 Letters (film)''
Ayinla
Hustle (2021 film)
Introducing the Kujus
Anikulapo (2022)

Awards and nominations

References

External links 
 

Covenant University alumni
Nigerian film actresses
Actresses from Lagos State
Living people
21st-century Nigerian actresses
Mayflower School alumni
1991 births
Yoruba actresses
Nigerian film award winners
Nigerian media personalities